Paul Winner (1934–2019) was an artist, Liberal activist, magistrate and public relations manager.

His works included the textbook, Effective PR Management, and a caricature of Pope John Paul II.

His ashes are buried on the eastern side of Highgate Cemetery.

References

External links
 Paul Winner art

1934 births
2019 deaths
Burials at Highgate Cemetery
Alumni of St John's College, Oxford
British artists
Liberal Party (UK) parliamentary candidates
English justices of the peace
People from Hampstead
British public relations people